Iulia Valentia Banasa was a Roman-Berber city in northern Morocco. It was one of the three colonias in Mauretania Tingitana founded by emperor Augustus between 33 and 25 BC for veterans of the battle of Actium, on top of a Mauretanian village. The site was in fact already occupied by the local Amazigh people from the 4th century BC, or perhaps earlier.

Characteristics
Iulia Valentia Banasa was located on the southern bank of the Sebou River on the site now known as Sidi Ali Boujenoun. At the start of the reign of Marcus Aurelius, Banasa became Colonia Aurelia Banasa. In 285 AD, the Roman province of Mauretania Tingitana was reduced to the territories located north of the Lixus. Banasa was then abandoned.

Among the stone ruins at Iulia Valentia Banasa are some characteristic elements of ancient Roman architecture: a forum with a basilica, capitol and baths, as well as streets in a regular pattern. Many of the buildings date from the early third century AD. Beautiful mosaics decorated the buildings and now most are shown at the Rabat archeological museum

The Latin name Valentia means young, strong and may be compared to Valence (France) and Valencia (Spain), also colonies. Augustus founded at least twelve Roman colonias in Mauretania, although it was a client-kingdom and not yet a province of the empire. Some of the other major Roman companion cities to Iulia Valentia Banasa of this early era are Chellah and Volubilis, the latter of which shares the features of basilica and regular street pattern.

Objects recovered at Banasa may be seen at the Rabat Archaeological Museum.

Gallery

See also

 Iulia Campestris Babba
 Iulia Constantia Zilil
 Lixus
 Mauretania Tingitana
 Rusadir
 Sala Colonia
 Tamuda
 Thamusida
 Tingis
 Volubilis

References

Bibliography
 William Seston & Maurice Euzennat, « La citoyenneté romaine au temps de Marc Aurèle et de Commode, d'après la Tabula Banasitana », CRAI, 105-2, 1961, p. 317-324

External links

Diplomatie France
Catalogue des Mosaïques de Banasa 
Tabula Banasitana 
Manar al-Athar digital photo archive (photos of different areas and angles of the site)

Archaeological sites in Morocco
Roman towns and cities in Morocco
Mauretania Tingitana
Coloniae (Roman)
Populated places established in the 1st century BC
Kénitra Province
Roman towns and cities in Mauretania Tingitana